The 1994 Southland Conference baseball tournament was held from May 15 to 19, 1994 to determine the champion of the Southland Conference in the sport of college baseball for the 1994 season.  The event pitted the top four finishers from the conference's regular season in a double-elimination tournament held at H. Alvin Brown–C. C. Stroud Field on the campus of Northwestern State in Natchitoches, Louisiana.  Third-seeded  won their first championship and claimed the automatic bid to the 1994 NCAA Division I baseball tournament.

Seeding and format
The top four finishers from the regular season were seeded one through four.  They played a double-elimination tournament.

Bracket and results

All-Tournament Team
The following players were named to the All-Tournament Team.

Most Valuable Player
Scott Pederson was named Tournament Most Valuable Player.  Pederson was an outfielder for Texas–San Antonio.

References

Tournament
Southland Conference Baseball Tournament
Southland Conference baseball tournament
Southland Conference baseball tournament